Qualification was done at the 2011 Pan American Championship in Rionegro, Colombia between May 6 and 8, 2011. The top eight athletes will qualify in each weight category. Mexico is guaranteed a full team granted if they compete with a full team at the qualification tournament, but if it does not manage to be in the top eight, the athlete from Mexico will take the slot allotted to the eight place athlete. There are also six wild cards to be distributed. Therefore, there is a total quota of 150 athletes.

Qualification summary

Qualification by category

55kg Men's Freestyle

60kg Men's Freestyle

66kg Men's Freestyle

74kg Men's Freestyle

84kg Men's Freestyle

96kg Men's Freestyle

120kg Men's Freestyle

55kg Men's Greco-Roman

60kg Men's Greco-Roman

66kg Men's Greco-Roman

74kg Men's Greco-Roman

84kg Men's Greco-Roman

96kg Men's Greco-Roman

120kg Men's Greco-Roman

48kg Women's Freestyle

55kg Women's Freestyle

63kg Women's Freestyle

A Mexican athlete did not compete in the weight category and the qualification tournament, therefore Mexico will not qualify an athlete.

72kg Women's Freestyle

There are 6 wild card spots that will be distributed among all weight classes.

References

External links
Final list of qualified countries

P
Qualification for the 2011 Pan American Games